{{Speciesbox
|image=Stewartia rostrata (34663033343).jpg
|image_caption=Flower
|image2=Stewartia rostrata - Arnold Arboretum - DSC06744.JPG
|image2_caption=Foliage
|genus=Stewartia
|species=rostrata
|authority=Spongberg
|synonyms_ref=
|synonyms=
Stewartia glabra S.Z.YanStewartia sinensis var. rostrata (Spongberg) Hung T.Chang
}}Stewartia rostrata'', the beaked stewartia, is a species of flowering plant in the family Theaceae, native to southeastern China. The Royal Horticultural Society considers it to be a good tree for smaller gardens.

References

rostrata
Endemic flora of China
Flora of Hubei
Flora of Southeast China
Plants described in 1974